Margaret Elizabeth Hamerik (13 December 1867 – 30 October 1942) was a Danish composer and pianist.

See also
List of Danish composers

References

Danish classical pianists
Danish women pianists
1867 births
1942 deaths
Danish women composers
20th-century Danish composers
19th-century Danish composers
Women classical pianists
20th-century women composers
19th-century women composers
19th-century women pianists
20th-century women pianists